Magnolia Park is an American rock band formed in Orlando, Florida, in 2019. They are currently signed to Epitaph Records.

Band members

Current members 

 Joshua Roberts - vocals
 Tristan Torres - guitar
 Freddie Criales - guitar
 Joe Horsham - drums
 Vincent Ernst - keyboard

Former members 
 Jared Kay - bass (2019-2023)

Timeline

Discography

Albums 
 Halloween Mixtape (2021)
 Baku's Revenge (2022)

EPs 

 Vacant (2019)

 Dream Eater (2021)

 Heart Eater (2022)

Concert tours 
Headlining
 Baku's Revenge Tour (2023)

References 

Musical groups established in 2019
American alternative rock groups
Musical groups from Orlando, Florida
American pop punk groups